Bucculatrix eschatias is a moth in the family Bucculatricidae. It is found in India. It was described in 1916 by Edward Meyrick.

References

Natural History Museum Lepidoptera generic names catalog

Bucculatricidae
Moths described in 1916
Taxa named by Edward Meyrick
Moths of Asia